FC Volga-d Ulyanovsk is a Russian football team from Ulyanovsk that currently plays in the Amateur Football League. It played professionally from 1997 to 1999. Their best result was 10th place in the Russian Second Division Zone Povolzhye in 1999. It is a farm club of FC Volga Ulyanovsk.

Team name and location history
 1994–1999: FC Energiya Ulyanovsk
 2000: FC Lada-Energiya Ulyanovsk (was the farm club of FC Lada-Energiya Dimitrovgrad in 2000 and 2001)
 2001: FC Lada-Energiya-2 Dimitrovgrad
 2002–2006: FC Energiya Ulyanovsk
 2007: FC Volga-Energiya Ulyanovsk (became the farm club of FC Volga Ulyanovsk beginning from this season)
 2008: FC Volga-d-Energiya Ulyanovsk
 2009–present: FC Volga-d Ulyanovsk

External links
  Team history at KLISF

Association football clubs established in 1994
Football clubs in Russia
Sport in Ulyanovsk
1994 establishments in Russia